The Spain men's national lacrosse team is governed by the Spanish Lacrosse Association.
Since 2006, Spain plays in the World Lacrosse Championship and the European Lacrosse Championships.The team is managed by Head Coach Mike Bartlett of Poynton Lacrosse who took over the role in August 2016.

Squad
The following players were called for the 2016 European Lacrosse Championship

Competitive record

Head to head against other national teams

Official matches

2006 World Lacrosse Championship

2008 European Lacrosse Championships

2010 World Lacrosse Championship

2012 European Lacrosse Championships

2014 World Lacrosse Championship

2016 European Lacrosse Championship

2018 World Lacrosse Championship

Top goalscorers
This list includes all official games except the 2008 European Championship, as there are not any available stats.

See also
Spain women's national lacrosse team
Lacrosse in Spain

References

External links
Spanish Lacrosse Association
Spain at European Lacrosse Federation website
Spain at Federation of International Lacrosse

Spain
L
Lacrosse in Spain